Anna Georgette Gilford (born 12 March 1981), professionally known as Honey G, is an English rapper. She was a contestant on the thirteenth series of The X Factor in 2016.

Personal life 
Honey G is Jewish and has claimed she has been bullied with antisemitism all her life. She attended Salford University and graduated with an upper second-class degree in music in 2004. In July 2017, she came out as a lesbian.

Career

2016: The X Factor 
In her first audition, she sang "Work It" by Missy Elliott, which earned her three yes votes. At the six-chair challenge, she sang "WTF (Where They From)" by Missy Elliott and Pharrell Williams, and was eliminated by mentor Sharon Osbourne; however, Osbourne brought her back as a replacement for Ivy Grace Paredes, who was unable to travel to Los Angeles due to visa issues. Osbourne later picked Honey G to advance after her performance of Coolio's "Gangsta's Paradise". She ended up in the bottom two for the first time against Ryan Lawrie on week 7. Cowell, Osbourne and Walsh voted to save her. However voting statistics revealed that Lawrie received more votes than Honey G meaning if Walsh sent the result to deadlock, Lawrie would've advanced to the quarter-final and Honey G would've been eliminated. Honey G was in the bottom two in the quarter-final against 5 After Midnight. After the sing-off, only Osbourne voted to send Honey G through to the semi-final, and finished in fifth place.

During her time in the competition, Honey G faced criticism for being a novelty act, branded such by judge Nicole Scherzinger. Isabel Mohan of The Telegraph gave her the title of "the biggest joke in X Factor history."

She performed at The X Factor Final at Wembley Arena as a guest performer where she officially announced that she had signed a record deal with Cowell's record label, Syco Music, and would be releasing her debut single, "The Honey G Show", on 23 December. The single received little promotion and reached number 149 on the UK Singles Chart.

2017–2018: Record label and music releases 
In May 2017, Honey G announced that she was launching an independent record label after being dropped by Syco Music. On 30 June 2017, she released her second single "Hit You with the Honey G" alongside a music video. In December 2017, she released her third single "Riding Hot with the Babes". The music video for the track was released on 12 January 2018, on the rapper's Vevo page.

2018–present 
During 2018 Gilford worked as an estate agent.

Throughout the COVID-19 lockdown, Honey G has been working on her weight loss and will be releasing a weight loss video in 2021 after announcing she had lost over two stone.

Honey G has also announced she has signed with SRL Publishing, a book publisher based in the UK and will be releasing her life story in 2022.

In 2022 Honey G appeared on Celebrity Coach Trip.

References

External links

Living people
1981 births
21st-century British rappers
English women rappers
Lesbian Jews
English lesbian musicians
LGBT rappers
Rappers from London
People from Harrow, London
Alumni of the University of Salford
Syco Music artists
The X Factor (British TV series) contestants
Jewish rappers
21st-century English women musicians
20th-century English LGBT people
21st-century English LGBT people
21st-century women rappers